Aphonopelma bicoloratum (also known as Mexican blood leg), is a species of spiders in the family Theraphosidae, found in Mexico. As it common name aptly states it is found in Mexico, and was first described by Ronny Struchen, D. Brändle and Gunter Schmidt in 1996. It is named after the latin word "bicoloratum" meaning bicolored. This tarantula is sometimes kept as pets, and are highly desired as such, though are rarely kept as such do to the price of this spider.

Description 
As its common name suggests, its legs are an orange color, which ranges from the metatarsus to the femur, the tarsus and trochanters being black. Its carapace is the same orange color as the legs, with the opisthosoma and chelicerae being black. The opisthosoma is also covered with long slender reddish hairs. Females live around 20 to 25 years, and males 5 to 7 years, under proper care of course.

Habitat 
It is found in South Western Mexico, though it is not clearly stated where, there habitat where they are found are mainly deserts and scrublands, alongside the pacific side of the country. The deserts and scrublands of South Western Mexico, are few and far between. This are found mainly in Puebla, where the main plants are Agave, Yuca, Opuntia, Aristida and Stipa. The average yearly rain fall is 450mm and 22ºC is the average temperature.

Behavior 
This spiders are from the new world, they are terrestrial, and while they are not big webbers, they will dig and move substrate quite a lot. This tarantula behavior is considered to mainly be docile, and are also known for not being skittish. They rarely throw hairs, and threat poses are few and far between, if any at all are given. But many have experience the pain of this hairs, as in their hides they may throw them.

References

bicoloratum
Spiders described in 1996
Spiders of Mexico